Kevin Roberts is an American academic who is the president of The Heritage Foundation. Prior to assuming his current role, he was the CEO of the Texas Public Policy Foundation in Austin, Texas. Roberts served as the president of Wyoming Catholic College from 2013 to 2016.

Education

Roberts earned a Bachelor of Arts degree in history from the University of Louisiana at Lafayette, a Master of Arts in history from Virginia Tech, and a Ph.D. in American history from University of Texas at Austin.

Career

Wyoming Catholic College 
He served as president of Wyoming Catholic College from 2013 to 2016 when he accepted his position as executive vice president of the Texas Public Policy Foundation.

During his tenure as president of Wyoming Catholic College, Roberts led the institution to an outright rejection of Title IV federal student loans and grants, citing religious liberty concerns.  This decision garnered significant national attention, as it made the college one of just a few nationally to reject such funding. In an article on the decision, The New York Times described Roberts and his students as "cowboy Catholics" for their independence.

Heritage Foundation 
In October 2021, it was announced that Roberts had been selected to replace Kay Coles James as president of The Heritage Foundation.

References

21st-century American historians
21st-century American male writers
American male non-fiction writers
Presidents of Catholic universities and colleges in the United States
Living people
University of Louisiana at Lafayette alumni
University of Texas alumni
Virginia Tech alumni
Year of birth missing (living people)
Texas Public Policy Foundation people
The Heritage Foundation